Police Matthu Dada is a 1991 Indian Kannada-language action film,  directed by  Thulasi-Shyam and produced by R. F. Manik Chand and K. Nithyanand. The film stars Vishnuvardhan, Sangeeta Bijlani, Roopa Ganguly and Srinath. The film has musical score by Bappi Lahiri. The film was simultaneously made in Hindi as Inspector Dhanush with slightly different supporting cast.

Cast

Vijay
Jamuna
Ramamurthy
M. S. Karanth
Seetharam
Rathnakar
Bangalore Nagesh
Umesh
Dingri Nagaraj
Thyagaraj Urs
Saikumar
Manjayya
Bemel Somanna
Vikram Udayakumar

Soundtrack 
Kannada Soundtrack
O Nannase - S. Janaki, S. P. Balasubrahmanyam (SPB)
Ayyayya Ho - SPB
Laila Laila - K. S. Chithra
Naanu Garam Garam - S. Janaki, SPB
Ee Balla Geethike - S. Janaki
Nanna Manadali - K. S. Chithra, SPB
Hindi Soundtrack
Lyrics: Indeevar 
"Aankhon Ka Noor Tu" - S. Janaki, S. P. Balasubrahmanyam
"Ayayia O Duniya" - S. P. Balasubrahmanyam
"Laila Laila (Honthon Ke Angarey Chhu Le)" - S. Janaki
"Mausam Garam Garam" - S. Janaki, S. P. Balasubrahmanyam
"Mera Suhaag Tu Mera Sindoor Tu" - S. Janaki
"Mere Bhi Mann Mein Hulchul" - S. Janaki, S. P. Balasubrahmanyam

References

External links
 

1991 films
Indian action films
1990s Kannada-language films
1990s Hindi-language films
Indian multilingual films
1991 action films
1991 multilingual films